Túrkeve is a town in Jász-Nagykun-Szolnok county, in the Northern Great Plain region of Hungary.

Geography

Demographics
According to the 2011 census, the total population of Túrkeve was 9,008, of whom there were 87.8% Hungarians and 2.4% Romani by ethnicity. 12.2% did not declare their ethnicity, excluding these people Hungarians made up 100% of the total population. In Hungary people can declare more than one ethnicity, so some people declared a minority one along with Hungarian.

Túrkeve is one of the least religious town in Hungary, 56.7% of the population was irreligious, while 17.9% was Hungarian Reformed (Calvinist) and 4.4% Roman Catholic.

Travel
There used to be a railway (link to the Hungarian Wikipedia page) connecting Mezőtúr and Túrkeve, owned by MÁV. However, due to low ridership, this was closed in the 1960s, and the track was removed thereafter. With the closure of the only rail line between Túrkeve and any other city, the other form of transport is through road, including a daily bus service.

Politics 
The current mayor of Túrkeve is Róbert Benedek Sallai (Independent).

The local Municipal Assembly, elected at the 2019 local government elections, is made up of 9 members (1 Mayor and 8 Individual list MEPs) divided into this political parties and alliances:

Notable people from Túrkeve
Alexander Finta (1881-1958), Hungarian-American artist
Alexander Korda (1893-1956), Hungarian-British film producer
Zoltan Korda (1895-1961), Hungarian-American film director
Vincent Korda (1897-1979), Hungarian-British art director

Twin towns – sister cities
Túrkeve is twinned with:
 Auchel, France
 Mezőhegyes, Hungary
 Porąbka, Poland
 Salonta, Romania
 Velykyi Bychkiv, Ukraine

References

External links

  in Hungarian

Populated places in Jász-Nagykun-Szolnok County